Samoa competed at the 2000 Summer Olympics in Sydney, Australia.

Results by event

Boxing
Men's 91 kg
Pauga Lalau
Round 1 – Lost to S Ibraguimov (Rus)

Cycling

Road Cycling
Women's Road Race
 Bianca Jane Netzler
 Final – DNF

Judo
Men's 73 kg
Travolta P Waterhouse
Round 1 – Lost to G Maddaloni (Ita) 
Round 1 – Lost to H Moussa (Tun)

Weightlifting

Men

Wrestling
Men's Greco-Roman 76 kg
Faafetai Iutana
Round 1 – Lost to A Michalkiewicz (Pol) 
Round 1 – Lost to D Manukyan (Ukr)
Round 1 – Lost to V Makarenko (Blr)

See also
 Samoa at the 2000 Summer Paralympics

References
Official Olympic Reports

Nations at the 2000 Summer Olympics
2000
2000 in Samoan sport